Idaea furciferata, the notch-winged wave moth, is a moth in the family Geometridae. It is found in North America, where it has been recorded from Maryland to northern Florida, west to Missouri and Texas.

The wingspan is about 17 mm for males and 15 mm for females. Adults are mostly on wing from April to August. The hindwings have a deep notch in males, which is absent in females. The forewings are tan in both sexes, with dull reddish brown lines and shading.

The larvae feed on Trifolium and Taraxacum species.

References

Moths described in 1873
Sterrhini
Moths of North America